Notobasis is a genus in the tribe Cardueae within the family Asteraceae. It is native to the Mediterranean region and the Middle East, from Madeira, the Canary Islands, Morocco and Portugal east to Egypt, Iran and Azerbaijan.

 Species
 Notobasis obovallata (M.Bieb. ex Willd.) - Caucasus
 Notobasis syriaca (L.) Cass. - Mediterranean

References

 Flora Europaea: Notobasis

Cynareae
Asteraceae genera
Edible plants